W. Wallace Kelley (February 2, 1902 – September 27, 1982) was an American cinematographer and visual effects artist.

Biography
He was nominated for an Academy Award in the category Best Visual Effects for the film Unconquered. Kelley died in September 1982 in Los Angeles, California, at the age of 80. He was buried in Forest Lawn Memorial Park.

Selected filmography 
 Unconquered (1947; co-nominated with Farciot Edouart, Devereux Jennings, Gordon Jennings, Paul Lerpae and George Dutton)

References

External links 

1902 births
1982 deaths
People from New Jersey
American cinematographers
Visual effects artists
Burials at Forest Lawn Memorial Park (Glendale)